Jesper Ismaila Ceesay (born 4 May 2003) is a professional footballer who plays as a midfielder for AIK. Born in Sweden, he is a youth international for the Gambia.

Career
Ceesay is a product of the youth academies of Hässelby and Brommapojkarna. At the age of 18 in 2020, he began his senior career with Brommapojkarna in the Ettan tournament. On 9 April 2021, he extended his contract with the club until 2023. In his sophomore season in 2021, he became a starter at the club and helped them win the 2021 Ettan, and was named the league's talent of the season. On 21 December 2021, he transferred to the Allsvenskan club AIK until 31 December 2025.

International career
Ceesay played for the Gambia U23s for 2023 U-20 Africa Cup of Nations qualification matches in September 2022.

Personal life
Born in Sweden, Ceesay is of Gambian descent through his father Ceesay who was a former footballer. His brother Joseph Ceesay is also a professional footballer.

Honours
Brommapojkarna
Ettan: 2021

References

External links
 

2003 births
Living people
People from Solna Municipality
Gambian footballers
The Gambia youth international footballers
Swedish footballers
Swedish people of Gambian descent
Gambian people of Swedish descent
IF Brommapojkarna players
AIK Fotboll players
Ettan Fotboll players
Allsvenskan players
Association football midfielders